The Tram in Vladivostok is a transportation in Vladivostok, Russia.  The first section opened on 9 October 1912. In 1991, the total length achieved , but all lines except one entirely on reserved track alongside roads, were abandoned by 2010 due to the recession after dissolution of the Soviet Union.

List of routes
6. Minnyy Gorodok – Sakhalinskaya

See also

 List of town tramway systems in Russia

References

External links

Vladivostok
Vladivostok
Transport in Vladivostok